Fernando Cabrera Cantó (1866–1937) was a Spanish painter and sculptor; whose themes ranged from the cheerful and satiric to the darkly morbid. He also did landscapes.

Biography 
He began his artistic education at the Real Academia de Bellas Artes de San Carlos in Valencia, where his teacher was a fellow Alcoyano, Lorenzo Casanova.

He collaborated with the architect, Vicente Pascual Pastor, in decorating the Casa del Pavo, one of the landmarks of Art Nouveau in Alcoy. His studio would later be located in the front part of that building. For much of his life, he was a teacher at the School of Arts and Crafts.

He participated in the National Exhibition of Fine Arts; receiving a Second Class prize in 1890 for "Huérfanos" (Orphans), and a First Class prize in 1906 for "Al Abismo" (To the Abyss...). He was also the recipient of awards at the Exposition Universelle (1900) and the Panama–Pacific International Exposition of 1915, in San Francisco.

Cantó's works show the influence of several 19th century painters, notably Mariano Fortuny, Ignacio Pinazo Camarlench and Eduardo Rosales. Many of his paintings express social commentary, while others are simple genre scenes, landscapes and portraits.

Selected paintings

References

Further reading 
 Pantorba, Bernardino de. El pintor Cabrera Cantó (biographical and critical essay), Madrid, Gran Capitán, 1945.
 Espí Valdés, Adrián. "Acercamiento al mundo plástico y humano de Cabrera y Cantó", in: Revista Eines, Alcoy, 1984, pp. 33–56.
 Hernández Guardiola, Lorenzo, Fernando Cabrera Cantó, (1866-1937), Diputació Provincial d'Alacant, 2005,

External links 

Biographical notes @ the Diccionario de Pintores Alicantinos

1866 births
1937 deaths
Spanish painters
Spanish genre painters
Spanish landscape painters
Spanish portrait painters
People from Alcoy